The Howling II is a 1979 horror novel by Gary Brandner. It is the first of two sequels to his 1977 werewolf novel, The Howling. The novel was later republished under the alternative titles The Howling II: The Return and  Return of the Howling.

Despite the ongoing film series that began in the 1980s, The Howling II was not adapted as a film and bears no similarities to the sequel Howling II: Your Sister Is a Werewolf (1985) or any of the other Howling films. The eighth film The Howling: Reborn (2011) credits the book as the source of its story, but bears no resemblance to it other than being a story about werewolves.

Plot
Three years after the events of The Howling, Karyn Beatty has now remarried and lives in Seattle. Although content with her new life with her husband, David Richter, and her young stepson Joey, she is still haunted by the memories of her terrifying ordeal in the California mountain village of Drago with its werewolf inhabitants. Karyn regularly sees a therapist to help work through her problems, but after a spate of sinister occurrences that culminate in the horrific killing of the family's housekeeper, Karyn is convinced that the surviving werewolves of Drago have tracked her down. Fearing for the lives of her new family, Karyn leaves town, hoping she will lead the evil creatures away from her loved ones.

Karyn's fears prove well founded as she had indeed been tracked down by none other than her ex-husband Roy Beatty (now a werewolf) and Marcia Lura, the evil Drago werewolf who first bit him. Both Roy and Marcia survived the fire in Drago, but Marcia is now partially scarred and incapacitated due to being shot in the head with a silver bullet by Karyn at the end of the first novel. Though the bullet did not kill her as expected, it left a streak of silver through her black hair and rendered her unable to fully transform into a wolf as before. Now, every night, she becomes a grotesque half-woman/half-wolf creature and wants revenge for what Karyn did to her.

In Mexico, Karyn tracks down Chris Halloran, the family friend who helped her during her first ordeal in Drago. She tells him that the werewolves of Drago have come for her and she needs his help once more. However, Chris's new girlfriend, Audrey, is jealous of his prior relationship with Karyn and does everything she can to undermine their friendship. When Roy and Marcia finally track Karyn down to Mexico, they set a trap for her at a Gypsy wagon with Audrey's unwitting help, and close in for the kill. Again, Chris comes to Karyn's rescue and fights with Roy (who is in the form of a wolf). Chris eventually manages to kill Roy with a silver-bladed knife, but in the nearby Gypsy wagon, Marcia is holding Karyn hostage and is about to torture her using a set of red hot pliers to pull the flesh off of her body a pinch at a time. As night arrives, Marcia abruptly begins her agonizing change into the half-woman/half-wolf creature. She drops the pliers, which then causes a fire to break out in the wagon, allowing Karyn to escape. Outside, Karyn is reunited with Chris while Marcia (or the creature she has become) burns to death as the wagon goes up in flames.

References

Werewolf novels
American horror novels
1979 American novels
The Howling novels
Sequel novels